Gur Gaz (also Romanized as Gūr Gaz and Gūr Goz; also known as Gorgoz, Gūrgūz, and Kūrgōs) is a village in Sangestan Rural District, in the Central District of Hamadan County, Hamadan Province, Iran. At the 2006 census, its population was 211, in 47 families.

References 

Populated places in Hamadan County